Europs pallipennis is a species in the family Monotomidae ("root-eating beetles"), in the suborder Polyphaga ("water, rove, scarab, long-horned, leaf and snout beetles").
It is found in North America.

References

Further reading
 Arnett, R.H. Jr., M. C. Thomas, P. E. Skelley and J. H. Frank. (eds.). (2002). American Beetles, Volume II: Polyphaga: Scarabaeoidea through Curculionoidea. CRC Press LLC, Boca Raton, FL.
 Arnett, Ross H. (2000). American Insects: A Handbook of the Insects of America North of Mexico. CRC Press.
 Bousquet, Yves (2003). "Review of the genus Europs Wollaston (Coleoptera: Monotomidae) of America, north of Mexico". Pan-Pacific Entomologist, vol. 79, no. 1, 11–22.
 Richard E. White. (1983). Peterson Field Guides: Beetles. Houghton Mifflin Company.

Monotomidae
Beetles described in 1861